Kaimana Hila is a Hawaiian song composed in 1916 by Charles E. King, assisted by Andrew Cummings, about Diamond Head, which can be viewed from Waikiki beach on Honolulu, Oahu Island.

Kaimana Hila means Diamond head, from the Hawaiian word "Kaimana", which means diamond, and the English word hill. It is one of the popular Hawaiian songs, like Aloha Oe, On a Little Bamboo Bridge, Blue Hawaii, and King's other song, the Hawaiian Wedding Song.

It is extremely popular in Japan, because of the imagery Diamond head from Waikiki, Honolulu, the Japanese people's most popular tourist destination in Hawaii.

The music is melodious and easy to remember. The words start with the following lines:

See also
Music of Hawaii
List of Hawaiian songs

References

Hawaiian music
Hawaiian songs
Hawaiian words and phrases